Christine Johnston may refer to:

 Christine Johnston (comedian), writer and performer, part of the Australian musical comedy trio The Kransky Sisters
 Christine Johnston (writer) (born 1950), novelist from New Zealand
 Christine Johnston (sailor) (born 1975), British sailor

See also
 Agnes Christine Johnston (1896–1978), American screenwriter